The discography of American country music singer-songwriter Brett Eldredge consists of seven studio albums, thirteen music videos, and fifteen singles, of which five have reached number one on the Billboard Country Airplay chart. He first charted a number one single with "Don't Ya".

Studio albums

Singles

As lead artist

As featured artist

Promotional singles

Other charted songs

Music videos

Notes

References 

Country music discographies
Discographies of American artists